Michelle F. Thomsen is space physicist known for her research on the magnetospheres of Earth, Jupiter, and Saturn.

Education and career 
Thomsen received an undergraduate degree from Colorado College in 1971. She then earned an M.S. (1974) and a Ph.D. (1977) in physics from the University of Iowa. Her doctoral advisor, James Van Allen, recruited her right from her entrance exam to work on the data from Pioneer 10 and Pioneer 11 on the radiation belts of Jupiter and Saturn. From 1977 until 1980 she remained at the University of Iowa as a postdoctoral scientist, and then left for the Max-Planck-Institut fur Aeronomie in Lindau, West Germany. In 1981 she joined Los Alamos National Laboratory. As of 2019, she is a guest scientist at Los Alamos and a senior scientist at the Planetary Science Institute.

Research 

Thomsen's early research was on the magnetospheres of Jupiter and Saturn. Her research on Earth's bow shock used the ISEE-1 and ISEE-2 satellites to track the behavior of high energy particles from the magnetosphere. She has also studied the cavities upstream of Earth's bow shock, the comet 21P/Giacobini–Zinner, and the physics of collisionless shocks. As a co-investigator of the co-investigator of Cassini Plasma Spectrometer (CAPS) program, she used the Cassini–Huygens mission to research Saturn and its moons.

Selected publications

Awards and honors 
Distinguished Alumni Award, University of Iowa (1985)
Honorary Doctorate in Science, Colorado College (1992)
Laboratory Fellow, Los Alamos National Laboratory (1997)
Group Achievement Award, National Aeronautic and Space Administration (1998)
Fellow, American Geophysical Union (2001)
Arctowski Medal, National Academy of Sciences (2019)
John Adam Fleming Medal, American Geophysical Union (2019)

References

External links 
 May 6, 2019

Colorado College alumni
University of Iowa alumni
Fellows of the American Geophysical Union
Living people
Space scientists
Women space scientists
Year of birth missing (living people)